Lord Edward Arthur Grosvenor, MC (27 October 1892 – 26 August 1929) was a British aviator.

Early life 
Grosvenor, also known as Ned, was born on 27 October 1892 to Hugh Grosvenor, 1st Duke of Westminster, and Katherine Caroline Cavendish, daughter of William Cavendish, 2nd Baron Chesham. Grosvenor was educated at Eton College before embarking on a career in the military.

Military service
After completing his education, Grosvenor joined the French Foreign Legion. In 1912, he left the legion and went on to be commissioned in the Royal Horse Guards. Joining the Royal Horse Guards from the Cheshire Yeomanry (with whom he served between 1910 and 1912), he began his service as a second lieutenant on probation.

After the outbreak of the First World War, Grosvenor transferred to the Royal Flying Corps and served in France and Italy. His wartime service saw him awarded the Military Cross as well as Italy's Order of Saints Maurice and Lazarus. The report of the award of the Italian honour by the King of Italy notes Lord Grosvenor as being a Flight Commander in the Royal Naval Air Service.

In May 1925, Grosvenor was attached to the RAF Experimental Station at Martlesham Heath in Suffolk.

In later life Grosvenor continued his military service as a member of the Royal Air Force Volunteer Reserve with No. 601 (County of London) Squadron as a squadron leader. It is believed that the squadron was formed at White's, a London gentlemen's club. As founder, the squadron historian notes that Grosvenor,

Personal life
Grosvenor married Lady Dorothy Margaret Browne (daughter of Valentine Browne, 5th Earl of Kenmare) on 5 August 1914 at Lyndhurst, close to Calshot Naval Air Station where he was attached at the time. The couple had two daughters.

Grosvenor participated in the 1924 Gordon Bennett Balloon Race as pilot along with a Squadron Leader Baldwin of the British balloon Banshee III.

In the same year, Grosvenor took charge of the British team which took part in the Schneider Trophy in the United States of America.

In 1925 Grosvenor was injured in a road traffic accident while travelling with his wife and Lady Juliet Trevor on the Old Folkestone Road. After colliding with another car his 'head went through the windscreen and his left knee through the instrument board'. Lord Grosvenor needed four stitches to a deep cut following the accident.

Grosvenor disliked motorcars and did not drive. He employed a former wartime colleague on a salary of £2 a day to drive him. The driver was to be available 24 hours a day and drove Grosvenor in a Morris 'upright' taxi.

His work in aviation also took in membership of the Standing Committee for the Civil aviation Section at the London Chamber of Commerce.

Aside from his aeronautical interests, Grosvenor served as chairman of the West End (London) branch of the Economic Insurance Company Ltd.

Grosvenor died on 26 August 1929 on the Isle of Wight. His funeral took place at Eccleston Church near Chester on 30 August 1929.

Grosvenor Cup
Grosvenor continued his relationship with aviation when he established a challenge cup to the Royal Aero Club in 1923.

In a bid to encourage low powered flight the rules stipulated that engines could not be more than 150 horse power. The aircraft had to be built in Britain and was only open to British pilots. The route was to run from Lympne Aerodrome and over Croydon, Bristol and Birmingham before returning to Lympne. In addition to the cup, Lord Grosvenor added a £100 first prize and £50 for second.

The first running of the Grosvenor Cup was won by Flight Lieutenant W. H. Longton flying a Sopwith Gnu and F. P. Raynham coming second in an Avro 504K. Sadly, Major Ernest Leslie Foot was killed when his aeroplane crashed at Chertsey.

Of the race he instituted, Grosvenor said -

References

1892 births
1929 deaths
Edward
People educated at Eton College
Recipients of the Military Cross
Royal Flying Corps officers
British World War I pilots
Younger sons of dukes
Royal Air Force squadron leaders
Soldiers of the French Foreign Legion
British Army personnel of World War I
Royal Horse Guards officers
Cheshire Yeomanry officers